Fabienne Keller (born 20 October 1959 in Sélestat, Bas-Rhin) is a French politician who has been serving as a Member of the European Parliament since 2019. She was previously the mayor (UDF) of Strasbourg, France, from March 2001 to March 2008.

Education
Keller studied at the École Polytechnique (X 1979) and the National School of Rural Engineering, Water and Forestry. She also graduated with a Masters in Economics from Berkeley. She undertook her military service in the intelligence service of the Mediterranean navy and remains a reserve Lieutenant Commander.

Early career
Keller began her career at the Ministry of Agriculture between 1985 and 1988 and was responsible for the management of the French cereal market, moving on to the Ministry of Finance (Treasury Department), where she was responsible for funding agriculture and fisheries.

In 1989, Keller was appointed CEO to the CIAL bank (Crédit Industriel d'Alsace Lorraine), and then, in 1996, General Manager of Crédit Commercial de France (CCF), which she left in 2001, the year of her election as mayor of Strasbourg.

Political career

Career in national politics
In addition to her work in local politics, Keller served on the Senate from 2005 until 2019. In this capacity, she made headlines when she voted against her party's line and supported 2013 legislation introducing same-sex marriage in France. She also wrote a 2018 report about congestion pricing in London and Stockholm, which formed the basis for legislation making it easier for cities to introduce congestion pricing in a bid to reduce traffic jams and air pollution.

In the Republicans’ 2016 presidential primaries, Keller endorsed Alain Juppé as the party’s candidate for the office of President of France. In November 2017, she co-founded Agir. Under the leadership of party chairman Franck Riester, she has since been serving as deputy chair alongside Frédéric Lefebvre, Laure de La Raudière and Claude Malhuret. She eventually left The Republicans in early 2018.

Member of the European Parliament, 2019–present
Since becoming a Member of the European Parliament, Keller has been serving on the Committee on Civil Liberties, Justice and Home Affairs. In addition to her committee assignments, she is part of the Parliament’s delegations for relations with the Mashreq countries and to the Parliamentary Assembly of the Union for the Mediterranean. She is also a member of the European Parliament Intergroup on Children’s Rights, the URBAN Intergroup and the MEPs Against Cancer group.

In 2022, Keller became a quaestor of the European Parliament, making her part of the Parliament's leadership under President Roberta Metsola.

Other activities
 French Office for the Protection of Refugees and Stateless Persons (OFPRA), Member of the Board of Directors
 French Development Agency (AFD), Member of the Board of Directors
 Haute école des arts du Rhin (HEAR), Member of the Board of Director
 Robert Schuman Foundation, Member of the Board of Directors

References

1959 births
Living people
People from Sélestat
Politicians from Grand Est
French people of German descent
Union for French Democracy politicians
Union for a Popular Movement politicians
The Republicans (France) politicians
Agir (France) MEPs
French Senators of the Fifth Republic
Senators of Bas-Rhin
Mayors of Strasbourg
MEPs for France 2019–2024
Women mayors of places in France
21st-century French women politicians
École Polytechnique alumni
University of California, Berkeley alumni
Women members of the Senate (France)